The 1984 Soviet Top League was the 15th season of the Soviet Top League and 47th since the start of the Soviet top-tier club competitions. It started on March 10 and continued until November 24.

Zenit Leningrad won their first league title, while the defending champion Dnepr Dnepropetrovsk finished third. The league was composed of 18 teams and draw limit was implemented this season of 10 games. There were only allowed two substitutions. Footballers who were on a team list for one team, during the season were not allowed to compete for another except for those who were demobilized from the Soviet Army (sic) and returned to their home club. Those athletes transferred during the season were not allowed to play against the team for which they played earlier.

Teams

Promoted teams
 FC Kairat Alma-Ata – champion (returning after a season)
 SKA Rostov-na-Donu – 2nd place (returning after two seasons)

Location

League standings

Results

Top scorers
19 goals
 Sergey Andreyev (SKA Rostov-on-Don)

18 goals
 Hamlet Mkhitaryan (Ararat)

17 goals
 Oleh Protasov (Dnipro)
 Yuri Tarasov (Metalist)
 Yuri Zheludkov (Zenit)

14 goals
 Andrei Redkous (Torpedo Moscow)

13 goals
 Sergey Rodionov (Spartak Moscow)
 Sergei Stukashov (Kairat)

12 goals
 Georgi Kondratyev (Dinamo Minsk)
 Yevstafi Pekhlevanidi (Kairat)

Medal squads
(league appearances and goals listed in brackets)

Number of teams by union republic

References

External links
 1984 season regulations. football.lg.ua
 1984 season calendar. fc-dynamo.ru
Soviet Union - List of final tables (RSSSF)

Soviet Top League seasons
1
Soviet
Soviet